Osier may refer to:

 Willow or osiers, a genus of deciduous trees and shrubs
 Common osier (Salix viminalis), a species of willow
 Red osier (Cornus sericea), a species of flowering plant
Osier, Colorado, an unincorporated community along the Rio de Los Pinos river in Colorado
Osier, Michigan, a ghost town
Faith Osier, African immunologist
 Ivan Osier (1888–1965), Danish Olympic medalist

See also
Osiier, a surname
 Cornus, a genus of woody plants